Dermott Hugh Brereton (born 19 August 1964) is an Australian former professional Australian rules football player in the Australian Football League (AFL) who is regarded as one of the greatest players of his generation. Of Irish descent (his parents migrated from Ireland before his birth), he was known for his aggressive style of play. Brereton kicked 464 goals and played in five premierships for  during his 211-game career. He is a former director of the Hawthorn Football Club and is currently an AFL commentator on Foxtel's 24-hour AFL channel, Fox Footy, as well as on radio station SEN 1116.

VFL/AFL career

Hawthorn (1982–1992) 
Dermott Brereton featured on the cover of the Inside the Battle of '89 DVD in a memorable-moment pose after recovering from a solid Mark Yeates shirtfront. Brereton, nicknamed "The Kid", played most of his career (189 games and 427 goals) in the centre half forward position at the Hawthorn Football Club, where he formed part of a potent forward line that included champion players such as Jason Dunstall.

His debut was against North Melbourne in the 1982 finals series—he kicked five goals and assisted in a few more.

While he played the game he had a reputation as a tough man, and as a big game performer was an important player in a number of Hawthorn's grand final teams during the 1980s (including premierships in 1983, 1986, 1988, 1989 and 1991).

Brereton was known for his bustling style and strong marking abilities and off-the-ball scuffles.

He won Hawthorn's best-and-fairest award in 1985 and was the team's leading goalkicker in the same year. He achieved All-Australian status in 1985.

Having bulked up over his career, Brereton became a football punisher and was known for his aggressive hip-and-shoulder bumps on running players. His targeting of other players by this method led to the charging rule being instigated to protect players whose intention was to focus on the ball.

A famous incident in 1988 involved Hawthorn's rival Essendon at Waverley Park. Brereton ran through the three-quarter-time huddle much to the surprise of the Bomber players causing a scuffle to break out. This incident was in retaliation to a free kick paid against Brereton for kissing Essendon's Billy Duckworth while Jason Dunstall lined up for goal. Dunstall kicked the goal; however, due to Brereton's indiscretion, the goal was disallowed. Brereton, fuming, ran through Essendon's huddle to prove a point. Post-match, Essendon's coach, Kevin Sheedy, shrugged off the event as insignificant, quipping: "Just another mad Irishman!"

Perhaps the most memorable moment of his career was the 1989 VFL Grand Final that was featured in a Toyota Memorable Moments television commercial. In one of the toughest grand finals in the league's history, Brereton was lined up at the centre bounce by Geelong Football Club's Mark Yeates and hit with a solid shirtfront. Severely winded and concussed, he was attended to by trainers. He began to vomit before jogging back into the play. Only minutes later in the game, he marked and kicked an inspirational goal. He would finish with three goals in a game that Hawthorn would win by six points. He was later diagnosed with broken ribs.

During his career at Hawthorn, Brereton was selected to play representative State of Origin football for Victoria nine times and kicked a total of 18 goals in this format.

Brereton's physical style of play came at a cost. By the end of 1992, he was suffering from crippling chronic hip pain and struggled to make a regular appearance. He didn’t play a game in 1993; and, at the end of the season, when offered a minimum-wage contract, decided to leave the club.

Sydney Swans (1994) 
During 1993, Brereton began to recover from the injuries that plagued his career at Hawthorn and expressed his intention to make a return to the game. The struggling Sydney Swans, in need of a big-name player capable of helping to turn around the team's performance as well as draw crowds to their home games at the SCG, drafted him for the 1994 season. Moving to New South Wales, he played only seven games, as frequent suspensions for rough and/or violent play prevented him from regaining peak form. His fame in Victoria was not equalled in New South Wales, and he also failed to have any appreciable on-field impact on the Swans' fortunes.

Brereton's most notable act as a Swan was infamously stomping on Hawthorn player Rayden Tallis's head while Tallis was on the ground in a pre-season game, earning him a seven-match suspension. He would receive another seven-week suspension in that same year when Richmond's Tony Free had his jaw broken with an alleged karate chop by Brereton. His only other moment of note during his time at Sydney was being flattened by West Coast Eagles' captain John Worsfold. The Swans delisted Brereton at the end of the 1994 season.

Collingwood (1995) 
Still wanting to perform at the highest level, Brereton worked on his fitness over the 1994–95 off-season and once again made himself available for the national draft.

While clubs are generally loath to recruit players above the age of 30, Collingwood nonetheless took a gamble on him. The Magpies' experiment was slightly more successful than his stint at Sydney, and in 15 games he kicked a total of 30 goals, ending his career at the end of 1995.

Statistics

|- style="background-color: #EAEAEA"
! scope="row" style="text-align:center" | 1982
|style="text-align:center;"|
| 47 || 2 || 5 || 4 || 16 || 4 || 20 || 6 ||  || 2.5 || 2.0 || 8.0 || 2.0 || 10.0 || 3.0 || 
|-
|style="text-align:center;background:#afe6ba;"|1983†
|style="text-align:center;"|
| 23 || 17 || 22 || 19 || 133 || 95 || 228 || 92 ||  || 1.3 || 1.1 || 7.8 || 5.6 || 13.4 || 5.4 || 
|- style="background-color: #EAEAEA"
! scope="row" style="text-align:center" | 1984
|style="text-align:center;"|
| 23 || 25 || 50 || 34 || 263 || 99 || 362 || 130 ||  || 2.0 || 1.4 || 10.5 || 4.0 || 14.5 || 5.2 || 
|-
! scope="row" style="text-align:center;" | 1985
|style="text-align:center;"|
| 23 || 25 || 58 || 37 || 273 || 109 || 382 || 136 ||  || 2.3 || 1.5 || 10.9 || 4.4 || 15.3 || 5.4 || 
|- style="background-color: #EAEAEA"
|style="text-align:center;background:#afe6ba;"|1986†
|style="text-align:center;"|
| 23 || 21 || 44 || 34 || 229 || 85 || 314 || 124 ||  || 2.1 || 1.6 || 10.9 || 4.0 || 15.0 || 5.9 || 
|-
! scope="row" style="text-align:center" | 1987
|style="text-align:center;"|
| 23 || 23 || 64 || 34 || 273 || 112 || 385 || 164 || 46 || 2.8 || 1.5 || 11.9 || 4.9 || 16.7 || 7.1 || 2.0
|- style="background-color: #EAEAEA"
|style="text-align:center;background:#afe6ba;"|1988†
|style="text-align:center;"|
| 23 || 17 || 47 || 26 || 189 || 55 || 244 || 123 || 21 || 2.8 || 1.5 || 11.1 || 3.2 || 14.4 || 7.2 || 1.2
|-
|style="text-align:center;background:#afe6ba;"|1989†
|style="text-align:center;"|
| 23 || 18 || 35 || 24 || 187 || 51 || 238 || 103 || 23 || 1.9 || 1.3 || 10.4 || 2.8 || 13.2 || 5.7 || 1.3
|- style="background-color: #EAEAEA"
! scope="row" style="text-align:center" | 1990
|style="text-align:center;"|
| 23 || 18 || 54 || 22 || 220 || 65 || 285 || 121 || 25 || 3.0 || 1.2 || 12.2 || 3.6 || 15.8 || 6.7 || 1.4
|-
|style="text-align:center;background:#afe6ba;"|1991†
|style="text-align:center;"|
| 23 || 17 || 39 || 28 || 171 || 64 || 235 || 98 || 25 || 2.3 || 1.6 || 10.1 || 3.8 || 13.8 || 5.8 || 1.5
|- style="background-color: #EAEAEA"
! scope="row" style="text-align:center" | 1992
|style="text-align:center;"|
| 23 || 6 || 9 || 6 || 35 || 14 || 49 || 18 || 8 || 1.5 || 1.0 || 5.8 || 2.3 || 8.2 || 3.0 || 1.3
|-
! scope="row" style="text-align:center" | 1994
|style="text-align:center;"|
| 2 || 7 || 7 || 5 || 30 || 20 || 50 || 21 || 9 || 1.0 || 0.7 || 4.3 || 2.9 || 7.1 || 3.0 || 1.3
|- style="background-color: #EAEAEA"
! scope="row" style="text-align:center" | 1995
|style="text-align:center;"|
| 3 || 15 || 30 || 12 || 95 || 51 || 146 || 43 || 13 || 2.0 || 0.8 || 6.3 || 3.4 || 9.7 || 2.9 || 0.9
|- class="sortbottom"
! colspan=3| Career
! 211
! 464
! 285
! 2114
! 824
! 2938
! 1179
! 170
! 2.2
! 1.4
! 10.0
! 3.9
! 13.9
! 5.6
! 1.4
|}

Post-football 
After a lack of success in his returns from retirement, Brereton announced his intention to retire from elite football in 1995. In 1996, he returned to Frankston Rovers (now Frankston Bombers), where he had his cheekbone broken by a Dromana player in the second round of the season. He played a handful of games before going into retirement proper at the conclusion of the season.

Brereton was inducted into the Hawthorn Team of the Century as well as the Australian Football Hall of Fame. He is also a member of the Mornington Peninsula Nepean Football League Hall of Fame.

His desire to continue playing football actively has seen him participate in the AFL Legends Match on several occasions. Each time, his lack of fitness is the focus of much mirth by the commentary team.

On 8 December 1997, he was appointed as a director of the Hawthorn Football Club and served in the role for just over eight years before retiring on 29 March 2006. One of the most notable incidents during his term as director was his alleged involvement in the run-up to a bench-clearing brawl between Hawthorn and Essendon in a 2004 encounter that became known as the Line in the Sand Match. During half-time, just before the brawl, Brereton had reportedly told Hawthorn players to "draw a line in the sand" and take a physical stand against Essendon; he denied making that particular remark, but he admitted to telling senior players "to stand up to any Essendon aggression".

In 2006, he began playing in the Yarra Valley Mountain District Football League with Division 1 club Woori Yallock alongside his 1995 Collingwood teammate Damian Monkhorst, kicking two goals on debut.

Commentary career 
From quite early in his playing career, Brereton pursued media appearances in anticipation of joining the media full-time when he retired. During the 1980s, he had a six-year stint on a morning show hosted by veteran television performer Ernie Sigley, who mentored the ambitious Brereton. In the early 1990s, he joined Channel Nine when the network began showing interest in Australian football for the first time in more than twenty years. He was one of the original panellists when the long-running AFL Footy Show began in 1994, and he also wrote in The Age. In 2000, he moved to the Seven Network to provide match commentary on AFL matches and host the ill-fated show The Game; he stayed at Seven until they relinquished the rights at the end of 2001. In 2002, he returned to the Nine Network to provide match commentary on AFL matches when the network commenced its AFL coverage. He continued to be a regular panellist for The AFL Footy Show.

In 2004, Brereton hosted The Run Home radio show on Melbourne AM radio station SEN 1116 with Anthony Hudson and Matthew Hardy, but he left due to a payment dispute. In previous years, he has also co-hosted the breakfast show on Melbourne FM station Gold 104.3 with Greg Evans, and he had also been a commentator on another FM station, Triple M.

In 2005, he appeared in a Toyota Memorable Moments advertisement featuring Stephen Curry that satirised the famous 1989 Grand Final incident with Geelong player Mark Yeates. In November of that year, Brereton was involved in an altercation with a group of young men.

In 2006, he made an appearance on Torvill and Dean's Dancing on Ice. Brereton left the show early after injuring his biceps. In 2006, Brereton was sacked from Triple M due to low ratings. In 2007, Brereton rejoined 1116 SEN to broadcast football, the same station he left two years earlier.

In 2007, Brereton started as a presenter on Channel 9's Getaway, a tourism and travel TV show, which was a position he held until 2011.

In 2011, he ended his 20-year association with the Nine Network and announced he would be joining Foxtel for the 2012 season. From 2012 onwards, he has provided match commentary for Foxtel and hosted the Fox League Teams show on Thursday nights on Foxtel's 24-hour AFL channel, Fox Footy, which launched on 17 February 2012.

Other work

Films 
He featured in a minor role in the critically panned 2002 film Trojan Warrior.

Video games 
Brereton has been a voice-over commentator for the AFL video game series since 2002.

TV 
Brereton competed in the 5th season of the Australian version of I'm a Celebrity...Get Me Out of Here!. He was eliminated on 5 February 2019 and finished in tenth place.

References

External links 

 Biography in the Hawthorn FC Hall of Fame
 Toyota memorable moment video featuring Dermott Brereton in the 1989 Grand Final

Australian rules footballers from Victoria (Australia)
Collingwood Football Club players
Hawthorn Football Club players
Hawthorn Football Club Premiership players
Hawthorn Football Club administrators
Sydney Swans players
All-Australians (1953–1988)
Victorian State of Origin players
Peter Crimmins Medal winners
Australian Football Hall of Fame inductees
Australian rules football commentators
Australian television presenters
Australian radio personalities
Australian people of Irish descent
1964 births
Living people
Australia international rules football team coaches
Australia international rules football team players
The Apprentice Australia candidates
I'm a Celebrity...Get Me Out of Here! (Australian TV series) participants
Radio personalities from Melbourne
Five-time VFL/AFL Premiership players